The 1993 NCAA Division I men's basketball tournament involved 64 schools playing in single-elimination play to determine the national champion of men's  NCAA Division I college basketball. It began on March 18, 1993, and ended with the championship game on April 5 in New Orleans, Louisiana. A total of 63 games were played.

North Carolina, coached by Dean Smith, won the national title with a 77–71 victory in the final game over Michigan, coached by Steve Fisher. Donald Williams of North Carolina was named the tournament's Most Outstanding Player. The most memorable play in the championship game came in the last seconds as Michigan's Chris Webber tried to call a timeout with his team down by 2 points when double-teamed by North Carolina.  Michigan had already used all of its timeouts, so Webber's gaffe resulted in a technical foul. Michigan subsequently vacated its entire 1992–93 schedule, including its six NCAA Tournament games, after it emerged that Webber had received under-the-table payments from a booster.

In a game that featured two great individual battles (one between Bobby Hurley and Jason Kidd, and the other between Grant Hill and Lamond Murray), two-time defending champion Duke was upset in the second round by California.

This year's Final Four was the closest the tournament came to having all four top seeds advance to the semifinals until all four did advance in the 2008 tournament. Indiana was the only top seed not to make it out of its regional; it was defeated by the 2-seed Kansas, in the Midwest regional finals. This tournament is also notable for the uneven distribution of first-round upsets.  While there were no upsets in the East, one 'minor' upset in the Midwest (9th seed Xavier defeated 8th seed New Orleans; Xavier was the betting favorite at all sports books in Las Vegas), and one 'medium' upset in the Southeast (11th seed Tulane beat 6th seed Kansas State), the West featured three remarkable upsets amongst the top 5 seeds, with a 12, a 13, and a 15-seed advancing to the second round in that region.  At the time, 15-seed Santa Clara's victory over 2-seed Arizona was only the second such upset, and following the 2022 tournament, is one of only ten times that a 15-seed defeated a 2-seed since the tournament field expanded to 64 teams (in 2018, Maryland-Baltimore County became the first 16-seed to defeat a 1-seed, ousting Virginia 74-54.).

In this tournament, the Louisiana Superdome was the only site in which the game clock counted down in whole seconds, not tenths of seconds, in the final minute of each period.

Schedule and venues

The following are the sites that were selected to host each round of the 1993 tournament:

First and Second Rounds
March 18 and 20
East Region
 Lawrence Joel Veterans Memorial Coliseum, Winston-Salem, North Carolina (Host: Wake Forest University)
Midwest Region
 Rosemont Horizon, Rosemont, Illinois (Hosts: DePaul University, Great Midwest Conference)
Southeast Region
 Orlando Arena, Orlando, Florida (Host: Stetson University)
West Region
 Jon M. Huntsman Center, Salt Lake City, Utah (Host: University of Utah)
March 19 and 21
East Region
 Carrier Dome, Syracuse, New York (Host: Syracuse University)
Midwest Region
 Hoosier Dome, Indianapolis, Indiana (Hosts: Butler University, Midwestern Collegiate Conference)
Southeast Region
 Memorial Gymnasium, Nashville, Tennessee (Host: Vanderbilt University)
West Region
 McKale Center, Tucson, Arizona (Host: University of Arizona)

Regional semifinals and finals (Sweet Sixteen and Elite Eight)
March 25 and 27
Midwest Regional, St. Louis Arena, St. Louis, Missouri (Host: Missouri Valley Conference)
Southeast Regional, Charlotte Coliseum, Charlotte, North Carolina (Host: University of North Carolina at Charlotte)
East Regional, Brendan Byrne Arena, East Rutherford, New Jersey (Hosts: Seton Hall University, Big East Conference)
West Regional, Kingdome, Seattle, Washington (Host: University of Washington)

National semifinals and championship (Final Four and championship)
April 3 and 5
Louisiana Superdome, New Orleans, Louisiana (Hosts: Tulane University, University of New Orleans)

Teams

Bracket
* – Denotes overtime period

East Regional – East Rutherford, New Jersey

Game summaries

East First round

at Winston-Salem, North Carolina

at Syracuse, New York

East Second Round

at Winston-Salem, North Carolina

at Syracuse, New York

East Regional semifinals

East Regional Finals

Midwest Regional – St. Louis, Missouri

Southeast Regional – Charlotte, North Carolina

West Regional – Seattle, Washington

Final Four – New Orleans, Louisiana

Game summaries

National semifinals

National Championship

# Michigan's entire 1992–93 schedule results were vacated, on November 7, 2002, as part of the settlement of the University of Michigan basketball scandal.  Unlike forfeiture, a vacated game does not result in the other school being credited with a win, only with Michigan removing the wins from its own record.

Announcers
 James Brown/Jim Nantz and Billy Packer – Brown/Packer, First & Second Round at Winston-Salem, North Carolina; Nantz/Packer, West Regional at Seattle; Final Four at New Orleans, Louisiana
 Dick Stockton and Al McGuire – First & Second Round at Indianapolis, Indiana; Southeast Regional at Charlotte, North Carolina
 Verne Lundquist and Clark Kellogg – First & Second Round at Rosemont, Illinois; East Regional at East Rutherford, New Jersey
 James Brown and Bill Raftery – Midwest Regional at St. Louis, Missouri
 Greg Gumbel and Digger Phelps – First & Second Round at Tucson, Arizona
 Sean McDonough and Derrek Dickey – First & Second Round at Orlando, Florida
 Mike Gorman and Larry Farmer – First & Second Round at Salt Lake City, Utah
 Mel Proctor and Dan Bonner – First & Second Round at Syracuse, New York
 Tim Ryan and Ann Meyers – First & Second Round at Nashville, Tennessee

See also
 1993 NCAA Division II men's basketball tournament
 1993 NCAA Division III men's basketball tournament
 1993 NCAA Division I women's basketball tournament
 1993 NCAA Division II women's basketball tournament
 1993 NCAA Division III women's basketball tournament
 1993 National Invitation Tournament
 1993 National Women's Invitation Tournament
 1993 NAIA Division I men's basketball tournament
 1993 NAIA Division II men's basketball tournament
 1993 NAIA Division I women's basketball tournament
 1993 NAIA Division II women's basketball tournament

References

NCAA Division I men's basketball tournament
Ncaa
NCAA Men's Division I Basketball Championship
NCAA Division I men's basketball tournament
NCAA Division I men's basketball tournament
Basketball
1990s in New Orleans